Liriope spicata is a species of low, herbaceous flowering plant from East Asia. Common names include creeping lilyturf, creeping liriope, lilyturf, and monkey grass. This perennial has grass-like evergreen foliage and is commonly used in landscaping in temperate climates as groundcover. Creeping lilyturf has white to lavender flowers which produce single-seeded berries on a spike in the fall. It is one of the most popular groundcovers in the southeastern United States and areas with a similar climate.

Distribution and habitat

Characteristics

Erect flower spikes with small, white to pale lavender flowers arise, somewhat hidden, among the leaves in late summer. Blackish berries develop in fall and often persist through winter. Roots have prominent rhizomes and frequent tubers. A cultivar exists with variegated leaves.

Creeping lilyturf looks very similar to another common species in the genus—lilyturf (Liriope muscari).   Creeping lilyturf can be distinguished by its rhizomatous root system (in contrast to the diffused root system of lilyturf), its less prominent flower spike being partially within leaves (lilyturf has a longer spike extending well above leaves), and its generally narrower and shorter leaves when compared those of lilyturf.<ref name=Mary>{{Cite web |url=http://etd.lsu.edu/docs/available/etd-04102007-113758/unrestricted/Broussard_dis.pdf |title=Mary C. Broussard. 2007. A Horticultural Study of Liriope and Ophiopogon: Nomenclature, Morphology and Culture. Louisiana State University. Dissertation. 129 p. |access-date=2009-07-03 |archive-url=https://web.archive.org/web/20100719044529/http://etd.lsu.edu/docs/available/etd-04102007-113758/unrestricted/Broussard_dis.pdf |archive-date=2010-07-19 |url-status=dead }}</ref>

Cultivation
Creeping lilyturf is easily grown in average, medium, well-drained soils in full sun to part shade. Moist, fertile soils with partial shade are ideal, but it also tolerates wide range of light and soil conditions. Creeping lilyturf also tolerates heat, humidity, and drought. The evergreen foliage often turns brown in late winter; old foliage can be cut back or mowed at a high setting before new shoots appear early spring. Creeping lilyturf is suitable for USDA zones 4 to 10.

Propagation
Germination characteristics of the seeds of creeping lilyturf are probably similar to those of Liriope muscari, which have been investigated more thoroughly; its germination guidelines should be followed.

Creeping lilyturf is easily reproduced by dividing the root mass and rhizomes.  The optimum time to do this is during the dormant season before onset of new growth. Plants produced by division are identical to the mother plant, and thus, cultivar traits are retained.

Uses
Creeping lilyturf is mainly used in mass plantings as a groundcover. Its tendency of aggressive spreading makes it generally unsuitable as a border plant. The species has been observed to establish rhizomes beneath concrete borders. Creeping lilyturf is an excellent plant to establish on steep slopes where erosion control is needed. Minimal maintenance is required.Liriope spicata is used as a substitute for mondo grass (Ophiopogon japonicus) in Chinese medicine as an herb for yin deficiency.Chinese Herbal Medicine Materia Medica Third Edition by Daniel Bensky, Steven Clavey, Erich Stoger and Andrew Gamble. Eastland Press, 2004

Air quality
According to NASA Clean Air Study, Liriope spicata filters formaldehyde,  ammonia, xylene and toluene from the air.

Problems
No serious diseases or pests occur for creeping lilyturf. Root rot (Pythium'') has been reported.  Anthracnose fungus sometimes causes reddish steaks in the leaves.  Scale insects have been reported to cause unsightly reddish spots on leaves during late summer. Slugs and snails are occasional pests.

Some people feel that creeping lilyturf has been overused as a landscaping plant and that suitable native plants can be used in its place.  Lilyturf is reported to have little wildlife value.

Like most other non-grass groundcovers, creeping lilyturf does not hold up to traffic well.

References

External links
Learn 2 Grow: Liriope Lovelies.
Fan District Association of Richmond, Virginia: Everything you wanted to know about ground cover in the tree out front--Liriope.

Nolinoideae
Flora of Asia
Plants used in traditional Chinese medicine
Garden plants of Asia
Groundcovers